The Aloha ʻĀina Party (Hawaiian for "love of the land") is a political party in Hawaiʻi that advocates for the sovereignty of Hawaiʻi and the promotion of Hawaiian cultural values.

History
The Aloha ʻĀina Party was reconvened in 2015 by founding members Donald Kaulia, Pua Ishibashi, and Desmon Haumea as a political action group. After two failed attempts at getting ballot access in 2016 and 2018, the party collected enough signatures to be certified as a political party for the 2020 election.

In 2020, the party fielded candidates in fifteen state legislative races on a platform to bring kanaka maoli (Native Hawaiian) values into governance. According to the Aloha ʻĀina Party Founders, the party was founded because of frustration with the state's handling of issues concerning both Kanaka Maoli as well as the citizens of Hawaiʻi at large, and the limited natural resources in Hawaiʻi including the Thirty Meter Telescope project on Mauna Kea. None of the candidates fielded by the party during the 2020 election won their races, with the two highest-performing candidates, state Senate candidate Ron Ka-Ipo and House of Representatives candidate Howard Greenberg, receiving about 20% of the vote. Other candidates averaged about 12-16% of the vote within their respective districts.

In 2022, the party nominated several candidates for local office, including one for state Senate and three for state Representative. They also nominated their first statewide candidate, Dan Decker, for the 2022 United States Senate election in Hawaii.

Ideology 
According to its website, the Aloha ʻĀina party advocates for a sovereign Hawaiʻi through the framework of hoʻoponopono ("making right what is wrong"), believing the overthrow of the Hawaiian Kingdom to have been an unjust act. It also promotes other Hawaiian values such as Mālama ʻĀina ("taking care of the land") and Aloha Kānaka ("love and care for the people").

While the party brands itself largely on Native Hawaiian issues, co-founder Pua Ishibashi has stated that "the AAP is not only for Hawaiians and is not limited to Hawaiian issues. The AAP is inclusive, welcomes all, and address the needs and concerns of all the people of Hawaiʻi".

Executive committee

See also

Green Party of Hawaii
Democratic Party of Hawaii
Hawaii Republican Party

References

External links

Anti-capitalist political parties
Anti-imperialism in Oceania
Politics of Hawaii
Political parties in Hawaii
Environmental parties in Hawaii
Secessionist organizations in the United States
Pro-independence parties
Hawaiian sovereignty movement
Native Hawaiian nationalist parties
Regional and state political parties in the United States